Rissoa lia is a species of minute sea snail, a marine gastropod mollusc or micromollusc in the family Rissoidae.

References

Rissoidae
Gastropods described in 1884